World's End is a district of Chelsea, London, lying at the western end of the King's Road. Once a Victorian slum area, council housing was built here in the 20th century, including the brutalist architecture World's End estate.

History

The area takes its name from the public house The World's End, which dates back to at least the 17th century. However, like the district known as Elephant and Castle, the origins of names of public houses are obscure. Attempts to explain the name World's End are likely to be misled by modern connotations of the phrase. A more likely explanation starts with the fact that "end" is simply an Old English word for a field. There are many villages and hamlets in Britain that have been called World's End since medieval times, suggesting that the name is simply agricultural.
In the King's Road, near Milman Street, is an inn styled "The World's End." The old tavern... was a noted house of entertainment in the reign of Charles II. The tea-gardens and grounds were extensive, and elegantly fitted up for the reception of company. The house was probably called "The World's End" on account of its then considerable distance from London, and the bad and dangerous state of the roads and pathways leading to it. (Old and New London, 1878)

It is mentioned in Congreve's Restoration comedy Love for Love (1695) as a place of questionable reputation to the west of London.

On Cary's New And Accurate Plan Of London And Westminster (1795), the inn is shown on the north side of Kings Road, the only building in the area. The modern public house, the World's End Distillery, on the south side of King's Road, was built in 1897.

Famous ex-residents of the Worlds End Estate include Christine Keeler and Joe Strummer.

The 1960s

The fashionable set who had made their home at the other end of the Kings Road discovered the World's End and found it was the perfect place to open the boutique Granny Takes a Trip. There were several boutiques and hippie shops that clustered round World's End in the late 1960s including Gandalf's Garden selling candles, incense, spiritual books and hippy paraphernalia. Sophisticat sold reconditioned pine furniture and was home to Christian the lion cub; The Sweet Shop at 28 Blantyre Street sold silk velvet patchwork and applique cushions, tunics, and wallhanging designed by artist Laura Jamieson. The shop was frequented by Twiggy, Jean Shrimpton, and Keith Richards.

A short distance away on the King's Road was the Dragon Tea Garden, a meeting place for local aristocrats, bohemians and hippies who sat on floor cushions, played backgammon and sipped exotic teas.  The World's End became a centre for the counter-culture world of the 1960s. This continued in the late 1970s and 1980s with the opening of the boutique SEX started by Vivienne Westwood in the 1970s (which is now known as World's End).

Housing
In the 1960s Chelsea Borough Council erected new social housing, in particular the Cremorne Estate (named after the historical Cremorne Gardens, which once stood on that site).

This was followed, in early 70's, by the red brick towers of the World's End estate which swept away many Victorian terraced houses. The estate was designed by Jim Cadbury-Brown and Eric Lyons, and is now known for its brutalist architecture.

Gallery

Transport
The nearest stations are:
Imperial Wharf (London Overground)
Fulham Broadway (London Underground)

References

Further reading

 Bignell, John. (Ed.) (1978). Chelsea seen from 1860 to 1980: A collection of photographs old and new pp. 96–99. Studio B. 
 Gullick, John (Ed.). (1975). A place called Chelsea pp. 106–109. City Journals Ltd. 
 Wheal, Donald James. (2005). World's End: A memoir of a Blitz childhood. Arrow Books. 

Areas of London
Districts of the Royal Borough of Kensington and Chelsea
King's Road, Chelsea, London